This is a list of Tamil national-type primary schools (SJK(T)) in Pahang, Malaysia. As of June 2022, there are 37 Tamil primary schools with a total of 2,531 students.

List of Tamil national-type primary schools in Pahang

Bentong District

Cameron Highlands District

Jerantut District

Lipis District

Kuantan District

Raub District

Temerloh District

Bera District

See also 

 Tamil primary schools in Malaysia
 Lists of Tamil national-type primary schools in Malaysia

References

Schools in Pahang
Pahang
pahang